Irene Sofía Esser Quintero (born 20 November 1991) is a Venezuelan actress, model and beauty pageant titleholder who was crowned Miss Venezuela 2011. Esser grew up in Río Caribe, Sucre, Venezuela.  She represented Venezuela in Miss Universe 2012, finishing as 2nd Runner-Up.

Personal life
Irene Esser was born in the city of Puerto Ordaz, but has studied and lived in the town of Río Caribe, located in the state of Sucre, since she was a little girl. Her father, Billy Esser Bonta, is an important cacao businessman, owner of Hacienda Bukare, founded in 1997. After graduating from "Andres Bello High School" in Carupano, she moved to England, where she took a course at Shrewsbury College.

Pageantry

Miss Venezuela 2011
Esser, who stands , competed as Miss Sucre, one of 24 finalists in her country's national beauty pageant Miss Venezuela 2011, held on October 15, 2011 in Caracas, where she obtained the Miss Elegance award and became the third Miss Venezuela winner from Sucre, gaining the right to represent her country in Miss Universe 2012.

Miss Universe 2012
Esser represented Venezuela at the Miss Universe 2012 pageant on December 19, 2012, in Las Vegas, Nevada, USA, where she finished as 2nd Runner-Up behind Janine Tugonon (Philippines) and winner Olivia Culpo (USA). She was one of the favorites to win the pageant. However, she faltered during the final question round and finished in third place. She has outdone two prior Miss Venezuela Marelisa Gibson (who failed to place) and Vanessa Gonçalves (who finished in the Top 16).

When asked by judge Diego Boneta "If you could make a new law, what would it be and explain why?", Esser responded:
I think that any leyes (laws) there are in Constitution or in life, are already made. I think that we should have, uh, a straight way to go in our similar, or, eh, in our lives as is this. For example, I'm a surfer, and I think that the best wave that I can take is the wave that I wait for it. So please do our only, eh, law that we can do. Thank you Vegas!

Esser was criticized by media, mocked by Craig Carton, Don Geronimo, Lili Estefan, Perez Hilton, Pablo Ramírez, Raul De Molina, amongst other personalities for her incomprehensible response and a video of her final question and answer became popular on YouTube. Her answer was even compared to Caitlin Upton's infamous response to her final question.

Filmography
In 2013, Irene was cast to star in the Venevisión telenovela titled Corazón Esmeralda alongside Luis Gerónimo Abreu.

References

External links
Miss Venezuela Official Website
Miss Venezuela La Nueva Era MB

1991 births
Venezuelan people of German descent
Living people
Miss Universe 2012 contestants
Miss Venezuela winners
People from Ciudad Guayana
Viral videos
Venezuelan telenovela actresses